Perlodini is a tribe of springflies in the family Perlodidae. There are more than 20 genera and 80 described species in Perlodini.

Genera
These 23 genera belong to the tribe Perlodini:

 Besdolus Ricker, 1952
 Chernokrilus Ricker, 1952
 Dictyogenus Klapálek, 1904
 Diura Billberg, 1820
 Filchneria Klapálek, 1908
 Guadalgenus Stark & Gonzalez del Tanago, 1986
 Hedinia Navás, 1936
 Helopicus Ricker, 1952
 Hydroperla Frison, 1935
 Isogenoides Klapálek, 1912
 Isogenus Newman, 1833
 Levanidovia Teslenko & Zhiltzova, 1989
 Malirekus Ricker, 1952
 Megaperlodes Yokoyama, Isobe & Yamamoto, 1990
 Oconoperla Stark & Stewart, 1982
 Perlodes Banks, 1903
 Perlodinella Klapálek, 1912
 Protarcys Klapálek, 1912
 Rauserodes Zwick, 1999
 Susulus Bottorff & Stewart, 1989
 Tadamus Ricker, 1952
 Yugus Ricker, 1952
 Zhiltzovaia Özdikmen, 2008

References

Further reading

External links

Perlodidae
Articles created by Qbugbot